Faurecia SE is a French global automotive supplier headquartered in Nanterre, in the western suburbs of Paris. In 2018 it was the 9th largest international automotive parts manufacturer in the world and #1 for vehicle interiors and emission control technology.  One in three automobiles is equipped by Faurecia. It designs and manufactures seats, exhaust systems, interior systems (dashboards, centre consoles, door panels, acoustic modules) and decorative aspects of a vehicle (aluminium, wood).

Faurecia's customers include the Volkswagen Group, Stellantis, Renault–Nissan–Mitsubishi, Ford, General Motors, BMW, Daimler, Toyota, Tesla, Inc., Hyundai-Kia, Jaguar Land Rover and BYD among others. Faurecia employs 8,300 engineers and technicians. The company operates over 300 production sites and 35 R&D centres in 37 countries worldwide, with 403 patents filed in 2017. About half of these sites are manufacturing plants operating on the just-in-time principle. Faurecia joined the United Nations Global Compact in 2004.

The company was at the core of a bribery scandal in 2006 which led to the resignation and legal conviction of its then CEO Pierre Lévi.

Origins 
Faurecia was formed in 1998 by two automotive component suppliers, Bertrand Faure and ECIA.

It designs and manufactures seats, exhaust systems, interior systems (dashboards, centre consoles, door panels, acoustic modules) and decorative aspects of a vehicle (aluminium, wood).

References

External links

Auto parts suppliers of France
French brands
Companies based in Île-de-France
Companies listed on Euronext Paris
Automotive companies established in 1997
French companies established in 1997
Nanterre